Kirsty Gunn (born 1960, New Zealand) is a novelist and writer of short stories. 

Her stories include "Rain", which led to the 2001 film of the same name, directed by Christine Jeffs and also the 2001 ballet by the Rosas Company, set to "Music for Eighteen Musicians" a 1976 score by Steve Reich.

Her novel The Boy and the Sea won the Scottish Arts Council Book of the Year award in 2007.

Her 2012 novel "The Big Music" won the Book of the Year in the 2013 New Zealand Post Book Awards.  The novel took seven years to write, and was inspired by pibroch, the classical music of the Great Highland Bagpipe.

She is professor of writing practice at the University of Dundee.

Bibliography
 1994 : Rain
 1997 : The Keepsake
 1999 : This Place You Return To Is Home
 2002 : Featherstone
 2006 : The Boy and the Sea
 2007 : 44 Things
 2012 : The Big Music
 2014 : Infidelities
 2015 : My Katherine Mansfield Project
 2016 : Going Bush
 2018 : Caroline's Bikini

References

External links
 British Council Literature page
 Official site

1960 births
Living people
New Zealand women short story writers
Academics of the University of Dundee
20th-century New Zealand women writers
21st-century New Zealand women writers
20th-century New Zealand writers
21st-century New Zealand writers
People educated at Queen Margaret College, Wellington
Alumni of St Hilda's College, Oxford